Bright Star Technology, Inc. was founded by Elon Gasper and Nedra Goedert during the early 1980s and was a key player in multimedia technology.   Well-known titles from Bright Star include HyperAnimation, Alphabet Blocks, and the Talking Tutors series. Bright Star was acquired by Sierra On-Line in 1992, and was a cornerstone of Sierra's educational games department.

Since the acquisition, several computer-related companies have been founded with this name, or a similar one.

Prior to starting the company, Gasper was teaching computer science at California Institute of Technology while trying to teach his daughter how to read. He became inspired by the lip-synchronization positions charts used in Disney animation. This inspired him to create animated tutors whose mouths moved realistically to humans. This continued to Early Math, which follows the curriculum from the National Association of Teachers of Mathematics.

In 1995, Information Technology Design Associates was hired to develop two titles for the Golden Books Interactive product line from Western Publishing Company. These two titles were Colours and Shapes with Hickory and Science Shop with Monker.

A.J.'s World was developed by Sierra's subsidiaries Coktel Vision and Bright Star Technology.

Bright Star's games
 Alphabet Blocks
 AJ's World of Language
 AJ's World of Math
 AJ's World of Discovery
 Spelling Jungle (also sold as Basic Spelling and Yobi's Basic Spelling Tricks; code-named Spelling Demons)
 Spelling Blizzard (also sold as Advanced Spelling)
 Kid's Typing
 Early Math
 Beginning Reading
 The Lost Mind of Dr. Brain
 Discover ABC and 123 with Hickory & Me (also sold as separate ABC and 123 products; produced in cooperation with Golden Books Family Entertainment)
 Discover Math and Spelling with Monker (also sold as separate Math and Spelling products; produced in cooperation with Golden Books Family Entertainment)

Bright Star's language education products
 Berlitz Live! Spanish (produced in cooperation with Berlitz International, Inc.)
 Berlitz Live! Japanese (produced in cooperation with Berlitz International, Inc.)

References

Sierra Entertainment
Defunct video game companies of the United States
Video game development companies
1992 mergers and acquisitions